Disband may refer to:

Disband (TV series) stylized as disBand, show on MuchMusic
Disband (band), American band